JMN may refer to:
 Janamorcha Nepal, a political party of Nepal
 Johan Mangku Negara (Companion of the Order of the Defender of the Realm), a Malaysian federal award
 Journal of Molecular Neuroscience
 Makuri language